The American Canadian Grand Lodge AF&AM (ACGL) arose initially from Square and Compass clubs founded by US and Canadian Masons serving in occupied postwar Germany. Many of these received charters from North American Grand Lodges to establish Masonic Lodges. They were the first or among the first internationally recognized Masonic Lodges operating in Germany since 1933. In 1954, the first American Lodge sought and was granted a warrant by a native German Grand Lodge, and during the next year, the number expanded to nine, becoming an American District under the United Grand Lodge (now the Grand Lodge of Ancient Free and Accepted Masons of Germany (GL AFuAMvD)). Differences in language and ritual, mutually recognised, led to the establishment of first a provincial Grand Lodge, then an independent American Canadian Grand Lodge 
in Germany.

The American Canadian Grand Lodge is a full member of the Conference of Grand Masters of Masons in North America (COGMNA).

References 

Freemasonry in Germany
Grand Lodges
United Grand Lodges of Germany